Predrag Vujović (born 20 August 1983) is a Montenegrin professional footballer.

Club career
Born in Bar, SR Montenegro, he had previously played with Serbian clubs FK Napredak Kruševac, FK Vojvodina, FK Borac Čačak, FK Metalac Gornji Milanovac, Polish Wisła Płock, Uzbekistani FC Shurtan Guzar and FK Buxoro, and Hungarian Kecskeméti TE.
In 2015, he signed a contract with FK Andijan. In the winter break of the 2015–16 season he returned to Serbia and joined FK Loznica.

References

External links
 Predrag Vujović at Srbijafudbal
 
 

1983 births
Living people
People from Bar, Montenegro
Association football midfielders
Serbia and Montenegro footballers
Serbian footballers
Montenegrin footballers
FK Napredak Kruševac players
Wisła Płock players
FK Vojvodina players
FK Borac Čačak players
FK Novi Pazar players
FC Shurtan Guzar players
Kecskeméti TE players
FK Metalac Gornji Milanovac players
Buxoro FK players
FK Andijon players
FK Loznica players
FK Trayal Kruševac players
First League of Serbia and Montenegro players
Ekstraklasa players
Serbian SuperLiga players
Serbian First League players
Uzbekistan Super League players
Nemzeti Bajnokság I players
Serbia and Montenegro expatriate footballers
Expatriate footballers in Poland
Serbia and Montenegro expatriate sportspeople in Poland
Expatriate footballers in Uzbekistan
Serbian expatriate sportspeople in Uzbekistan
Expatriate footballers in Hungary
Serbian expatriate sportspeople in Hungary